Phillip M. "Felipe" Archuleta (May 12, 1949 – December 16, 2014) was an American politician.

Political career
Archuleta was a Democratic member of the New Mexico House of Representatives, serving from 2013 until his death on December 16, 2014, in Las Cruces, New Mexico. Archuleta defeated his predecessor, then-independent Andy Nuñez, as well as a Republican candidate in 2012 to win the seat in a three-way race.

Background
Archuleta was born in Taos, New Mexico. He lived in Bayard, New Mexico and went to Northern New Mexico College and the National Judicial College. He worked for the New Mexico Transportation Department and then the New Mexico Labor Department. He died of pneumonia in 2014 after a period of declining health, aged 65.

References

External links
 
Legislative page

1949 births
2014 deaths
Democratic Party members of the New Mexico House of Representatives
People from Taos, New Mexico
People from Grant County, New Mexico
Northern New Mexico College alumni